Lenox Township is one of the twenty-seven townships of Ashtabula County, Ohio, United States. The 2010 census found 1,450 people in the township.

Geography
Located in the center of the county, it borders the following townships:
Jefferson Township - north
Denmark Township - northeast corner
Dorset Township - east
Cherry Valley Township - southeast corner
New Lyme Township - south
Rome Township - southwest corner
Morgan Township - west
Austinburg Township - northwest corner

No municipalities are located in Lenox Township.

Name and history
It is the only Lenox Township statewide.

The first settler in Lenox Township was former Maryland resident Lyle Asque, who arrived in 1807. Lenox Township was organized in 1819.

Government
The township is governed by a three-member board of trustees, who are elected in November of odd-numbered years to a four-year term beginning on the following January 1. Two are elected in the year after the presidential election and one is elected in the year before it. There is also an elected township fiscal officer, Robin Hayford-Fiebig who serves a four-year term beginning on April 1 of the year after the election, which is held in November of the year before the presidential election. Vacancies in the fiscal officership or on the board of trustees are filled by the remaining trustees.  Currently, the members of the board are John Maylish, Barry Weaver, and James Robinsoni

References

External links
County website

Townships in Ashtabula County, Ohio
1819 establishments in Ohio
Populated places established in 1819
Townships in Ohio